Tosirips is a genus of moths of the tribe Archipini.

Species
Tosirips magyarus Razowski, 1987
Tosirips perpulchrana Kennel, 1901

References

 , 1987: A new palaearctic Archipini genus (Lepidoptera: Tortricidae). Nota Lepid. 10: 87-92.
 , 2005: World Catalogue of Insects 5.
 tortricidae.com

External links

Archipini
Tortricidae genera
Taxa named by Józef Razowski